Bertha Lewis (born 1951) is the founder and president of the Black Institute, an 'action tank' whose mission is 'to shape intellectual discourse and dialogue and impact public policy uniquely from a Black perspective (a perspective which includes all people of color in the United States and throughout the Diaspora).'  She was the CEO and Chief Organizer of the nonprofit social justice organization ACORN until it disbanded in 2010. In early 2014, she was a member of New York City Mayor Bill de Blasio's Transition Team.

Lewis attended Hanover College, in Hanover, Indiana 1967–68. She was appointed to lead ACORN in May 2008. In that position, Ms. Lewis oversaw the operations of its 400,000 strong membership, which was active in over 110 cities across the country. A 16-year veteran of the organization, Lewis was previously the executive director of ACORN's New York affiliate and is a founding co-chair of the New York Working Families Party.

She has opposed the plastic bag ban in New York City. Prior to voicing her opinion, she received payments from the American Progressive Bag Alliance, a lobbying group that represents U.S. plastic bag manufacturers.

Awards and recognition
 2004 Citizen Activist Award of the Gleitsman Foundation for her work in public education reform
 2005 Leon Bogues award for community and political activism, by New York State Black and Puerto Rican Legislators, Inc.
 2006  “Influentials” in politics by New York magazine
 2007 100 Most Influential Women of New York, by Crains magazine

References

External links
"CEO Says ACORN 'Isn't Dead Yet'", NPR, Deborah Tedford, March 23, 2010
"ACORN CEO Reflects On The Group's Hard Times", NPR, March 23, 2010
"Bertha Lewis", Huffington Post

Living people
African-American people in New York (state) politics
African-American women in politics
African-American activists
American community activists
American housing activists
American anti-poverty advocates
American social democrats
1951 births
Hanover College alumni
Working Families Party politicians
21st-century African-American people
21st-century African-American women
20th-century African-American people
20th-century African-American women